Mount Le Conte (or LeConte) is a mountain located in the Sierra Nevada of California. The boundary between Inyo and Tulare counties runs along the crest of the Sierra, across Mount Le Conte. The mountain was named in 1895 for Joseph Le Conte (1823–1901), the first professor of geology and natural history at the University of California.

Geography 

The southwest side of Mount Le Conte drains into Rock Creek, thence into the Kern River, which ends in the Central Valley of California. The north side of Mount Le Conte drains into Meysan Creek, thence into Lone Pine Creek, which ends in the Owens Valley. The east side of Le Conte drains into Tuttle Creek, and thence into Diaz Lake in the Owens Valley.

The southwest side is in Sequoia National Park while the north and east is in the John Muir Wilderness of the Inyo National Forest.

See also 
 Mountain peaks of California

References

External links 
 

Mountains of Sequoia National Park
Mountains of the John Muir Wilderness
Mountains of Inyo County, California
Mountains of Tulare County, California
Mountains of Northern California